In below is squad of Indonesia Super League All-Star who released on July 11, 2012.

Staff
Head coach :  Miroslav Janu (Persela Lamongan)

Players

|-----
! colspan="11" bgcolor="#B0D3FB" align="left" |
|----- bgcolor="#DFEDFD"

|-----
! colspan="11" bgcolor="#B0D3FB" align="left" |
|----- bgcolor="#DFEDFD"

|-----
! colspan="11" bgcolor="#B0D3FB" align="left" |
|----- bgcolor="#DFEDFD"

Line-Up

Starting 11

Substitutions

References

2012 All Star Team
All